Haizidao is a new religious movement in Taiwan, based on Taoism. The organisation was formed in 1984 for the purpose of saving human beings.

References

New religious movements
Religion in Taiwan
Taoist schools